Acrocercops breyeri is a moth of the family Gracillariidae, known from Argentina. The hostplant for the species is Senecio bonariensis.

References

breyeri
Moths of South America
Moths described in 1962